Orford is a village with historic town status in Suffolk, England, within the Suffolk Coast and Heaths AONB.

History

Like many Suffolk coastal towns it was of some importance as a port and fishing village in the Middle Ages. It has a mediaeval castle, built to dominate the River Ore and a Grade I listed parish church, St Bartholomew's. The castle was built as a royal castle built by Henry II in the period 1165-1173 as an assertion of monarchical power in the region. Although the castle became less important after the king's death in 1189, the importance of Orford as a port grew. By 1200 its level of trade exceeded that of nearby Ipswich. Henry III granted Orford its first charter and the town returned a member of parliament in 1298, although it did not function as a constituency throughout the 14th century.

Local amenities
The population of Orford greatly increases during the summer months, partly due to its flourishing sailing club. In common with other Suffolk coastal towns and villages, a substantial number of properties in Orford are holiday or second homes.

As well as the Castle, Orford's attractions include river cruises, three pubs, a renowned traditional bakery, a smokehouse and a restaurant; the Butley-Orford Oysterage.

Orford was rated as among the "20 most beautiful villages in the UK and Ireland" by Condé Nast Traveler in 2020 and its castle as "worthy of a storybook".

Governance
Historically Orford was an ancient borough institutionalised as Orford Corporation. It returned two members of parliament for the Orford constituency from 1523 to 1832. However, considered a rotten borough, this status was revoked by the Municipal Corporation Act of 1883.
Orford forms part of the electoral ward called Orford and Tunstall. The population of this ward at the 2011 census was 1,830.

Notable people
 John Kirby was a school master in Orford.
 Charlie Underwood M.B.E - Lighthouse Attendant and Author of "The Great Light" and "My Orford" (1924-1997)

Gallery

See also
 Orford, Suffolk (UK Parliamentary constituency)

References

External links

 Photographs and more details about Orford
 A Fishy Tale of Orford
 The Wild Man of Orford – An animated version of the 12th Century myth
 "My Orford" by Charlie Underwood M.B.E. – An interesting insight into village life in Orford.

 
Villages in Suffolk
Civil parishes in Suffolk